Haruka may refer to:

People
Haruka (given name), a Japanese given name

Haruka (model) (born 1975), Japanese fashion model

Music
"Haruka" (Melody song)
"Haruka" (Scandal song)
"Haruka" (Tokio song)
"Haruka" (Yoasobi song)

Other uses
Haruka (fly), a genus of flies in the family Pachyneuridae
Haruka (satellite) or HALCA, a Japanese decommissioned radio telescope satellite
Haruka (train), a Japanese passenger train service
 Haruka: Beyond the Stream of Time, a video game series and media franchise
Haruka (citrus), a Japanese citrus cultivar

See also
Haruka Seventeen, a Japanese media franchise